The Yellow Springs Group is a geologic group in Iowa. It preserves fossils dating back to the Devonian period.

See also

 List of fossiliferous stratigraphic units in Iowa
 Paleontology in Iowa

References
 

Geologic groups of Iowa
Devonian System of North America